The 1880 Kentucky University football team represented Kentucky University—now known as Transylvania University—in the 1880 college football season. This was Kentucky U's first ever season. The first game is claimed as the first game ever played in the south at Stoll Field, though Washington & Lee and VMI played earlier games;  it's the first game in the state of Kentucky. The game was said to have resembled a combination of soccer and rugby. Kentucky U won both its games over Centre College.

Schedule

See also
 List of the first college football game in each US state

References

Kentucky University
Transylvania Pioneers football seasons
College football undefeated seasons
Kentucky University football